Charles Norman Millican (October 9, 1916 – December 1, 2010) was an American professor and academic administrator. He was the founding president of the University of Central Florida, then named Florida Technological University.

Family and Education
Millican was born in Wilson, Arkansas.  As a young man, he worked as a part-time reporter for Dun and Bradstreet while earning a Bachelor of Science degree in business and religion from Union University.  He graduated in 1941 and was named pastor of Olive Branch Baptist Church in Mississippi.

Millican later entered the Southern Baptist Theological Seminary in Kentucky.  But, he returned to Jackson, Mississippi, to serve as a coordinator for the 44th College Training Detachment of the United States Army Air Forces from 1943 to 1945.

He married Frances Hilliard on May 15, 1945 in Jackson, Tennessee.

Millican returned to school, and in 1946 earned his Master of Arts degree in economics from George Peabody College, then joining the Commerce Department at his alma mater Union University. He would move south to Gainesville, Florida, in 1948, to earn a Ph.D. in business finance and economics from the University of Florida.  Millican joined the university faculty, and was appointed the assistant dean of the Warrington College of Business Administration in 1956.  Soon thereafter, he left for Texas where he became dean of the School of Business Administration at Hardin-Simmons University.

In 1959 he moved to Tampa, Florida, to become dean of the College of Business Administration at the University of South Florida.

University of Central Florida presidency

On October 19, 1965, Millican was appointed as the founding president of a new state university in Florida, then without a name or even a campus.  Millican, with the advice of a citizen advisory group, selected the name "Florida Technological University," though it is now known as the University of Central Florida. The campus site he selected was just east of Orlando, Florida.  He is also credited with establishing twin tenets for the university, "Accent on the Individual" and "Accent on Excellence." Millican also chose the new university's motto: "Reach for the Stars."  And, he was a co-designer of its distinctive "Pegasus" seal. The highlight of Millican's presidency was at his new university's commencement ceremonies in 1973, when he played host to President Richard Nixon.

Millican stepped-down as university president on January 31, 1978, but remained on the faculty.  He was given the title of "President Emeritus," and taught classes in finance. Due to his role in shaping the university, Millican is considered by many to be the "Father of UCF."

Later years
After leaving UCF, Millican served as the president of nearby Lake Highland Preparatory School from 1982 to 1985, and continued as president emeritus-consultant until 1993. Millican returned to serve the University in 1993 as president emeritus and special assistant to the chief executive officer of the UCF Foundation. Millican died on December 1, 2010, at his home in Central Florida.

See also
List of University of Central Florida faculty and administrators

References

External links
 President Millican's papers at the UCF Library
 Charles Millican

Peabody College alumni
University of Florida alumni
Union University alumni
Presidents of the University of Central Florida
1916 births
2010 deaths
United States Army Air Forces soldiers
United States Army personnel of World War II